Kralanh District is a district located in Siem Reap Province, in north-west Cambodia. According to the 1998 census of Cambodia, it had a population of 56,915.

Administrative divisions

References 

Districts of Cambodia
Geography of Siem Reap province